The 1892 Kentucky Derby was the 18th running of the Kentucky Derby. The race took place on May 11, 1892.

Full results

Winning breeder: George J. Long (KY)

Payout
 The winner received a purse of $4,230.
 Second place received $300.
 Third place received $150.

References

1892
Kentucky Derby
Derby
May 1892 sports events